A total solar eclipse occurred on 11 August 1999 with an eclipse magnitude of 1.0286. A solar eclipse occurs when the Moon passes between Earth and the Sun, thereby totally or partly obscuring the image of the Sun for a viewer on Earth. A total solar eclipse occurs when the Moon's apparent diameter is larger than the Sun's, blocking all direct sunlight, turning day into darkness. Totality occurs in a narrow path across Earth's surface, with the partial solar eclipse visible over a surrounding region thousands of kilometres wide.
The path of the Moon's shadow began in the Atlantic Ocean and, before noon, was traversing the southern United Kingdom, northern France, Belgium, Luxembourg, southern Germany, Austria, Slovenia, Croatia, Hungary, and northern FR Yugoslavia (Vojvodina).

It was the first total eclipse visible from Europe since 22 July 1990, and the first visible in the United Kingdom since 29 June 1927.

Observations

{
  "type": "ExternalData",
  "service": "page",
  "title": "SE1999Aug11T.map"
}
Because of the high population densities in areas of the path, this was one of the most-viewed total solar eclipses in human history; although some areas in the path of totality (mainly in Western Europe) offered impaired visibility due to adverse weather conditions.

Some of the organized eclipse-watching parties along the path of totality set up video projectors on which people could watch the Moon's shadow as it raced towards them. There was substantial coverage on International TV stations of the progress of the eclipse shadow. The Moon's shadow was also observed from the Russian Mir space station; during the eclipse, video from Mir was broadcast live on television.

 The BBC concentrated its coverage efforts on the first landfall of the shadow across the western end of Cornwall (from St Ives to Lizard), which was packed with an extraordinary number of visitors, although Cornwall did not have nearly as many as expected leading to many specially organised events being left with very small attendance. The veteran amateur astronomer, broadcaster and eclipse-watcher Patrick Moore was brought in to head a live programme, but the eclipse was clouded out. BBC One also produced a special version of their Balloon Idents for the event. The BBC did not have a presence at Goonhilly on the Lizard Peninsula, one of the few places in Cornwall where the clouds parted just in time for the total eclipse to be visible. There was extensive cloud in Perranporth which parted just in time, allowing the very large crowd that filled the beach and hillsides to witness the event.
 Some of the best viewing conditions were to be had mid-Channel, where ferries were halted in calm conditions to obtain an excellent view. Hundreds of people who gathered on the island of Alderney also experienced the event.  
 Also at sea, many of the Fastnet fleet contestants encountered totality crossing the Celtic Sea on the way to the Fastnet Rock.
 A gathering of several thousand people at the airport in Soissons, France, which was on the path of totality, were denied all but a few fleeting glimpses of the eclipse through the overcast sky. The clouds cleared completely just a few minutes after the eclipse.
 In contrast, the overcast sky in Amiens, France, where thousands had gathered, cleared only minutes before the eclipse began.
 Further inland, viewing conditions were also perfect at Vouziers, a French country town gridlocked by Belgian cars from day-visitors. The patchy cloud covering cleared a short time before the shadow arrived. Some photos from Vouziers were used on the subsequent BBC Sky at Night programme.
 The San Francisco Exploratorium featured a live webcast from a crowded town square in Amasya, Turkey.
 Doordarshan, the national TV channel in India, broadcast live coverage from Srikakulam, hosted by the TV personality Mona Bhattacharya.
 A Bulgarian Air Force MiG-21 two-seater was used by the Bulgarian Academy of Sciences to study the solar corona. The MiG-21, flying at 1600–1700 km/h (M=1,4-1,5) at an altitude of 13,000 m, was able to stay in the Moon's umbra for 6 min. The photographer, an air force pilot, used two film cameras, both fitted with 200 mm lenses and infrared filters, and one Digital8 video camera.
 Hungary's most popular tourist destination, Lake Balaton and its surrounding area, fell into the path of the eclipse entirely, which made the area even more popular for that day. The motorway leading there was so crowded, many people had to watch the eclipse while caught in a traffic jam.
 One French and two British Concordes briefly followed the eclipse with tourists on board.
 The BBC was filming one of its episodes for its TV series Airport that day and, during the show, resident press officers Russell Clisby and Steve Meller took photographs of the eclipse at Heathrow Airport, as well as Aeroflot supervisor Jeremy Spake witnessing the eclipse on a special charter flight.
 RTS, the national public broadcaster of Serbia, urged people to remain inside, citing dangers to public health. This caused the streets of all Serbian cities, towns and villages to be entirely deserted during the eclipse, with many opting to watch it on TV instead.
 The BMJ a month after the eclipse reported only 14 cases of eye damage from improper viewing of the eclipse, a number lower than initially feared. In one of the most serious cases the patient had looked at the Sun without eye protection for twenty minutes, but overall the public health campaign had succeeded.

Gallery

Notable times and coordinates

Related eclipses

Eclipses of 1999 
 A penumbral lunar eclipse on January 31.
 An annular solar eclipse on February 16.
 A partial lunar eclipse on July 28.
 A total solar eclipse on August 11.

Solar eclipses 1997–2000

Saros 145

Metonic series

See also 
 List of solar eclipses visible from the United Kingdom

Notes

References

 Eclipse at hermit.org
 "Club Krile Magazine", Vol. 11, 1999, "Air Group 2000" Publishing, Sofia, Bulgaria
 The Total Solar Eclipse of 1999 August 11
 Russia expedition

Photos
 Turkey. Prof. Druckmüller's eclipse photography site
 Hungary. Prof. Druckmüller's eclipse photography site
 France. Prof. Druckmüller's eclipse photography site
 Bulgaria
 Solar Corona Shape
 Exploratorium Webcast: Solar Eclipse August 11, 1999
 KryssTal - Eclipse in Cornwall (UK)—totality not seen but scene photographed
 Solar eclipse of August 11, 1999 Romania, shown in Romanian Maximum Card 
 Solar eclipse of August 11, 1999 Romania, shown in Romanian Maximum Card 
 Images from Turkey by Crayford Manor House Astronomical Society 
 A Crescent Sunrise, APOD 8/17/1999, partial eclipse from Quebec, Canada
 Sun Block, APOD 8/18/1999, totality from Hungary
 Light From The Dark Sun, APOD 8/19/1999, totality from Siofok, Hungary
 At The Sun's Edge, APOD 8/20/1999, totality near Bagdere, Turkey
 The Big Corona, APOD 4/8/2001, totality by Fred Espenak
 Total Eclipse of the Active Sun, APOD 6/20/2001, from Kecel, Hungary
 Diamond Ring in the Sun, APOD 6/21/2001, totality from eastern Turkey
 Looking Back at an Eclipsed Earth, APOD 9/26/2004, total eclipse shadow seen from Mir spacestation, chosen as APOD again on 6/10/2007
 Russian scientist observed eclipse

1999 08 11
1999 08 11
1999 in science
August 1999 events in Asia
1999 in the United Kingdom
1999 in France
1999 in Belgium
1999 in Luxembourg
1999 in Germany
1999 in Austria
1999 in Slovakia
1999 in Slovenia
1999 in Hungary
1999 in Romania
1999 in Yugoslavia
1999 in Bulgaria
1999 in Turkey
1999 in Iran
1999 in Iraq
1999 in Syria
1999 in Pakistan
1999 in India
August 1999 events in Europe